The 2022–23 Gibraltar Intermediate Cup is a single-leg knockout tournament played by under-23 clubs from Gibraltar, who compete in the Gibraltar Intermediate League. 

The champions of the first edition were Mons Calpe, who defeated Manchester 62 4–1 in the final on 15 January 2019. This second edition will see the tournament return for the first time in 4 years, with a new format.

Format
The new format was revealed along with the draw in December 2022. Teams will be split into 3 groups (two groups of 4 and one group of 3), with the group winners and best runner-up progressing to the semi-finals.

Group stage

Group 1

Group 2

Group 3

Scorers
6 goals
 Adam Gracia (College 1975 Intermediate)
5 goals
 Jonathan Sciortino (Lincoln Red Imps Intermediate)
4 goals

 Liam Preston (Lions Gibraltar Intermediate)
 Kayden Gonzalez (St Joseph's Intermediate)

3 goals

 Matthew Codali (College 1975 Intermediate)
 Mitch Gibson (Europa Intermediate)
 Manuel Ledesma (Europa Intermediate)
 Stevie Black (Europa Point Intermediate)
 Charlie Hardiman (Europa Point Intermediate)
 Charles Gaivizo (Lions Gibraltar Intermediate)
 Luigi Walton (Lions Gibraltar Intermediate)
 Omar Salah (Lynx Intermediate)
 Maxim Zeulevoet (St Joseph's Intermediate)

2 goals

 Julian Del Rio (Bruno's Magpies Intermediate)
 Ashton Wahnon (Bruno's Magpies Intermediate)
 Ignacio Giampaoli (College 1975 Intermediate)
 Charley McMillan-Lopez (College 1975 Intermediate)
 Jaron Vinet (Europa Intermediate)
 Dion Hammond (Europa Point Intermediate)
 Kristoffer Krebs (Europa Point Intermediate)
 Hicham Akroum (Glacis United Intermediate)
 Julerson (Glacis United Intermediate)
 Evan Green (Lions Gibraltar Intermediate)
 Jack Lee (Lions Gibraltar Intermediate)
 Mai (Lions Gibraltar Intermediate)
 Manuel Canas (Lynx Intermediate)
 Theo Pizarro (Manchester 62 Intermediate)
 Stefan Viagas (Manchester 62 Intermediate)
 Jairon Guest (St Joseph's Intermediate)

1 goal

 Cameron Carnegie (Bruno's Magpies Intermediate)
 Aaron Levy (Bruno's Magpies Intermediate)
 Christian Mason (Bruno's Magpies Intermediate)
 Hugo Bartkowiak (College 1975 Intermediate)
 Kivan Castle (College 1975 Intermediate)
 Kaylan Franco (College 1975 Intermediate)
 Daniel Rodgers (College 1975 Intermediate)
 Jyron Zammitt (College 1975 Intermediate)
 Rhys Byrne (Europa Intermediate)
 James Caetano (Europa Intermediate)
 James Castle (Europa Intermediate)
 Christian Orihuela (Europa Intermediate)
 Declan Pizarro (Europa Intermediate)
 Karl Poggio (Europa Intermediate)
 Stefan Thorne (Europa Intermediate)
 Andrew Cruz (Europa Point Intermediate)
 Modoumatarr Mbye (Europa Point Intermediate)
 Matthew Plumb (Europa Point Intermediate)
 Jonathan Westerberg (Europa Point Intermediate)
 Reed Wilson (Europa Point Intermediate)
 Soulemane Ba (Glacis United Intermediate)
 Julian Britto (Glacis United Intermediate)
 Cecil Prescott (Glacis United Intermediate)
 Anthony Celecia (Hound Dogs)
 Ashley Harrison (Hound Dogs)
 Jian Tavares (Hound Dogs)
 Kyle Clinton (Lincoln Red Imps Intermediate)
 Jaylen Duarte (Lincoln Red Imps Intermediate)
 Samir Omari (Lincoln Red Imps Intermediate)
 Luismi Delgado (Lions Gibraltar Intermediate)
 Aaram Hanglin (Lions Gibraltar Intermediate)
 Leonard Noble (Lynx Intermediate)
 Aiden Olivares (Lynx Intermediate)
 Fraser Carnegie (Manchester 62 Intermediate)
 Kieron Garcia (Manchester 62 Intermediate)
 Kevan Gonzalez (Manchester 62 Intermediate)
 Ahmed El Ouahabi (St Joseph's Intermediate)
 Jesse Segui (St Joseph's Intermediate)

Own goals
 Kyle Segovia (Lincoln Red Imps Intermediate) vs Manchester 62 Intermediate
 Julian Laguea (Lincoln Red Imps Intermediate) vs Manchester 62 Intermediate

Notes

See also
2022–23 Gibraltar Intermediate League

References

2022–23 in Gibraltar football
Football competitions in Gibraltar